Wyncote may refer to:

Wyncote, Pennsylvania 
Wyncote Records, a short-lived subsidiary of Cameo-Parkway Records